Big House is a historic home located at Palisades in Rockland County, New York. The Big House is the oldest dwelling in Palisades and the only building remaining from the hamlet's formative years.  It was built about 1735 and is a large stone dwelling in a vernacular ethnic "Dutch" style.  It consists of a rectangular central block flanked on either side by wings.  In the nomination for the National Register of Historic Places it is further described as embodying the distinctive characteristics of the eighteenth-century regional Dutch vernacular building tradition, specifically its one-and-one-half story, gable-roofed form, linear plan, multiple entrances, and masonry construction.

It was listed on the National Register of Historic Places in 1990.

References

External links

Houses on the National Register of Historic Places in New York (state)
Historic American Buildings Survey in New York (state)
Gothic Revival architecture in New York (state)
Houses completed in 1735
Houses in Rockland County, New York
National Register of Historic Places in Rockland County, New York